Parkdale was a Canadian federal electoral district represented in the House of Commons of Canada from 1917 to 1979. It included the community of Parkdale in the western part of Toronto, Ontario. It was created in 1914 from Toronto West, and continued to exist until 1976 when most of it was merged into Parkdale—High Park with some sections into Trinity.

Boundary history
It initially consisted of the part of the city of Toronto west of a line beginning where Queen Street West meets Lake Ontario, east along Queen Street West to Dovercourt Road, north the Canadian Pacific Railway, west to the boundary of Ward 7, then along the boundary of Ward 7 to the northwest corner of High Park.

In 1924, it was redefined to consist of the part of the city of Toronto east of Atlantic Avenue and Dovercourt Road, and south of Bloor Street, and west of Indian Road and following Indian Road, Howard Park Avenue, and Sunnyside Avenue.

In 1933, it was redefined to consist of the part of the city of Toronto east of the westerly limit of Davenport Riding from Lake Ontario to the line of the Canadian Pacific Railway; thence westerly along the line of the Canadian Pacific Railway to the boundary between ward six and ward seven of the city of Toronto; thence southerly along the boundary between ward six and ward seven to the point where it intersects Bloor Street; thence westerly along the centre line of Bloor Street to the centre line of Indian Road; thence southerly along the centre line of Indian Road to the centre line of Howard Park Avenue; thence easterly along the centre line of Howard Park Avenue to its intersection with the centre line of Sunnyside Avenue; thence southerly along the centre line of Sunnyside Avenue to Lake Ontario; thence easterly along Lake Ontario to Dufferin Street.

It was further redefined several times.

In 1966, it was defined to consist of the part of Toronto west of Atlantic Avenue and Dovercourt Road, south of Bloor Street, and east of Parkside Drive.

The electoral district was abolished in 1976 when it was merged with parts of the High Park-Humber Valley and Trinity districts to form Parkdale—High Park.

Members of Parliament

This riding has elected the following Members of Parliament:

Election results

|- 
  
|Government (Unionist)
|Herbert Mowat 
|align="right"| 13,306  
 
|Independent
|Carson Alexander McCormack
|align="right"|  7,736   
  
|Opposition (Laurier Liberals)
|Gordon Waldron
|align="right"|3,698   
|}

|- 
  
|Conservative
|David Spence 
|align="right"|10,705    
  
|Liberal
|William Douglas 
|align="right"| 5,487   

|James Simpson 
|align="right"| 2,723 
|}

|- 
  
|Conservative
|David Spence 
|align="right"|14,483    
  
|Liberal
|Kenneth A. Christie
|align="right"|5,299   
|}

|- 
  
|Conservative
|David Spence
|align="right"| 11,897    
  
|Liberal
|Bertram Tipping
|align="right"| 4,133   
|}

|- 
  
|Conservative
|David Spence
|align="right"|11,713    
  
|Liberal
|Angus Gillies
|align="right"| 5,823   
|}

|- 
  
|Conservative
|David Spence
|align="right"| 9,619    
  
|Liberal
|John Leslie Prentice
|align="right"| 7,761   

 
|Co-operative Commonwealth
|Rose Henderson
|align="right"| 3,249   
|}

|- 

|Herbert Alexander Bruce
|align="right"| 13,605    
  
|Liberal
|Jack Travers
|align="right"| 12,487   
|}

|- 
  
|Progressive Conservative
|Herbert Alexander Bruce 
|align="right"|11,588    
  
|Liberal
|Jack Travers
|align="right"|9,981   
 
|Co-operative Commonwealth
|Ford Brand
|align="right"| 4,188   

|}

|- 
  
|Progressive Conservative
|Harold Timmins 
|align="right"|  8,212    
  
|Liberal
|John Hunter 
|align="right"|  7,569   
 
|Co-operative Commonwealth
|Ford Brand
|align="right"| 6,470   
 
|Unknown
|Elizabeth Morton 
|align="right"| 966   
 
|Unknown
|Len Palmer 
|align="right"| 64   
|}

|- 
  
|Liberal
|John Hunter
|align="right"| 12,876   
  
|Progressive Conservative
|Harold Timmins
|align="right"| 10,137    
 
|Co-operative Commonwealth
|Arthur Waters
|align="right"| 6,242   
|}

|- 
  
|Liberal
|John Hunter 
|align="right"|10,391   
  
|Progressive Conservative
|Irene McBrien
|align="right"| 6,788    
 
|Co-operative Commonwealth
|Archie A. Chisholm 
|align="right"| 3,788   

|}

|- 
  
|Progressive Conservative
|Arthur Maloney 
|align="right"|  9,882    
  
|Liberal
|John Hunter 
|align="right"| 7,671   
 
|Co-operative Commonwealth
|Archie A. Chisholm
|align="right"| 3,979   
 
|Independent PC
|John Boland
|align="right"| 342 
|}

|- 
  
|Progressive Conservative
|Arthur Maloney
|align="right"|  13,640    
  
|Liberal
|John Hunter 
|align="right"|  8,599   
 
|Co-operative Commonwealth
|Archie A. Chisholm 
|align="right"| 3,492   

|}

|- 
  
|Liberal
|Stanley Haidasz
|align="right"| 10,780   
  
|Progressive Conservative
|Arthur Maloney 
|align="right"| 8,946    
 
|New Democratic
|Tom Campbell 
|align="right"| 5,759   

|}

|- 
  
|Liberal
|Stanley Haidasz
|align="right"| 12,694   
  
|Progressive Conservative
|William C. Dymond
|align="right"|6,308    
 
|New Democratic
|Tom Campbell
|align="right"| 5,538   

|}

|- 
  
|Liberal
|Stanley Haidasz
|align="right"| 11,974   
  
|Progressive Conservative
|Felicity Cochrane
|align="right"| 6,104    
 
|New Democratic
|Ralph Dye 
|align="right"| 5,194   
|}

|- 
  
|Liberal
|Stanley Haidasz
|align="right"|14,717   
 
|New Democratic
|Bruce Rogers 
|align="right"| 8,983   
  
|Progressive Conservative
|Kay Armstrong
|align="right"|5,057    
|}

|- 
  
|Liberal
|Stanley Haidasz
|align="right"| 12,214   
  
|Progressive Conservative
|Lubor J. Zink 
|align="right"|  8,990    
 
|New Democratic
|Mike Gurstein 
|align="right"| 6,478   
 
|No affiliation
|Dennis Deveau
|align="right"| 201    
|}

|- 
  
|Liberal
|Stanley Haidasz
|align="right"| 13,134   
  
|Progressive Conservative
|Lubor J. Zink  
|align="right"| 7,133    
 
|New Democratic
|Evelyn Cotter
|align="right"| 4,479   
 
|Independent
|Terence Young
|align="right"| 144   

|}

|- 
  
|Progressive Conservative
|Yuri Shymko
|align="right"| 6,759    
  
|Liberal
|Art Eggleton
|align="right"| 5,721   
 
|New Democratic
|Doug Little
|align="right"| 4,806   

|}

References

Former federal electoral districts of Ontario
Federal electoral districts of Toronto